The Eternity Man is a chamber opera in one act and seven scenes by the Australian composer Jonathan Mills to a libretto by Dorothy Porter. It deals with the life of Arthur Stace who was known as "The Eternity Man" because he chalked the word "Eternity" about 500,000 times in over 35 years on Sydney's walls and footpaths.

The opera is written for four voices. These include the voice of Stace himself (baritone) and three female characters (soprano, mezzo-soprano, contralto) who represent alternatively Stace's sister, Myrtle; a Darlinghurst brothel keeper; and an assortment of female choruses – female freaks at the Sydney Royal Easter Show and also ghosts of female convicts and a gaggle of Kings Cross drag queens. A performance lasts for about 70 minutes.

Performance history
The work was commissioned by and premiered at London's Almeida Theatre on 23 July 2003, conducted by Stuart Stratford, production by Benedict Andrews, with singers Richard Jackson, Tara Harrison, Claire McCaldin and Andee-Louise Hippolite. The work had one Australian season, at the Sydney Festival in January 2005. That performance at the Sydney Opera House Studio, conducted by Richard Gill included the singers Grant Smith, Christa Hughes, Belinda Montgomery, Inara Molinari.

Film adaptation

In 2008 director Julien Temple adapted the work into a 64-minute film with funding from the ABC and Britain's Channel 4. It was first shown in June 2008 at the Sydney Film Festival, subsequently at film festivals in Melbourne, Locarno, Athens, Cologne, Vancouver, Warsaw, Mar del Plata. In 2008 it won the ATOM Award for Best Experimental Film, the Gold Cinematography Award and the Judges Award for Best Work of the Year at the Queensland Australian Cinematography Awards. It was also named the Best Performing Arts program at the international 2009 Rose d'Or. The film screened on the ABC on 18 January 2009. The cast includes Grant Doyle and Christa Hughes.

References

External links
Details of the score at Boosey & Hawkes
The Eternity Man, ABC program notes

TV review and images
Film official home page

Operas
2003 operas
English-language operas
One-act operas
Chamber operas
Operas set in the 20th century
Cultural depictions of Australian men
Cultural depictions of 20th-century painters
Operas by Jonathan Mills
Operas set in Australia
Operas adapted into films
Operas based on real people